Highlands and Islands Airports Limited (HIAL) is a company based at Inverness Airport that owns and operates 11 airports in the Scottish Highlands, the Northern Isles and the Western Isles.

It is a private limited company wholly owned by the Scottish Government, and is categorised as Executive Non Departmental Public Body (ENDPB) of the Scottish Government.

History
Highlands and Islands Airports Limited was incorporated on 4 March 1986 by the Civil Aviation Authority. In 1995, ownership transferred from the CAA to the Secretary of State for Scotland, and to the Scottish Ministers upon devolution.

The company was criticised for a PFI deal signed to build a new terminal at Inverness Airport, which meant that HIAL had to pay £3.50 to the PFI operator for every passenger flying from the airport. In 2006, the PFI deal was cancelled, costing the Scottish Executive £27.5m.

Funding
It receives subsidies from public funds under terms of the Civil Aviation Act 1982. For the year ending 31 March 2018, HIAL received £29.2 million of public money, of £20.6m was classed as revenue subsidy, and £8.6m was capital investment.

Airports

HIAL operates the following airports:

Barra Airport
Benbecula Airport
Campbeltown Airport
Dundee Airport
Inverness Airport
Islay Airport
Kirkwall Airport
Stornoway Airport
Sumburgh Airport
Tiree Airport
Wick Airport

References

External links
Company website

 
Transport companies established in 1986
Aviation in Scotland
1986 establishments in Scotland
Companies based in Highland (council area)
Executive non-departmental public bodies of the Scottish Government